Titanium metallic discoloration has been reported to have occurred with titanium-containing ointment causing papules on the penis of a patient.  Titanium screws used for orthopedic procedures, if they come near the skin, can also causes cutaneous blue-black hyperpigmentation.

See also
Skin lesion

References

 
Disturbances of human pigmentation